The following lists the organization of the Union and Confederate forces engaged at the Battle of Roanoke Island, during the American Civil War on February 7–8, 1862.

Union

Union Army
Coast Division (Brig. Gen. Ambrose E. Burnside)
First Brigade (Brig. Gen. John G. Foster) K-19 W-113 M-0 =132
10th Connecticut - Col Charles L. Russell
23rd Massachusetts - Col John Krutz
24th Massachusetts - Col Thomas G. Stevenson
25th Massachusetts - Col Edwin M. Upton
27th Massachusetts - Col Horace C. Lee
Second Brigade (Brig. Gen. Jesse L. Reno) K-15 W-79 M-13 =107
21st Massachusetts - Ltc Alberto R. Maggi
9th New Jersey - Ltc Charles A. Heckman
51st New York - Col Edward Ferrero
51st Pennsylvania - Col John F. Hartranft
Third Brigade (Brig. Gen. John G. Parke) K-0 W-17 M-0 =17
8th Connecticut - Col Edward Harland (general)
11th Connecticut - Col Henry W. Kingsbury (regiment not engaged)
9th New York - Col Rush C. Hawkins
4th Rhode Island - Col Isaac P. Rodman
5th Rhode Island, detachment - Maj John Wright
Unassigned units:
1st New York Marine Artillery (detachment) - Col William A. Howard
99th New York (Union Coast Guard) - Lt Charles W. Tillotson

Army gunboats:
Picket
Vidette
Hussar
Lancer
Ranger
Chasseur
Pioneer
Sentinel

Union Navy
North Atlantic Blockading Squadron (Flag Officer Louis M. Goldsborough)

Confederate

Confederate Army
Dist. of Roanoke — Brig. Gen. Henry A. Wise (not present in battle; ill)
Col. Henry M. Shaw, second in command
2nd North Carolina Battalion
8th North Carolina
17th North Carolina (3 companies)
31st North Carolina
46th Virginia
59th Virginia
(The Virginia regiments were part of the Wise Legion)

Confederate Navy
"Mosquito Fleet" (Flag Officer William F. Lynch)
CSS Sea-Bird (flagship) 
CSS Curlew (sunk)
CSS Ellis
CSS Beaufort
CSS Raleigh
CSS Fanny
CSS Forrest
CSS Appomattox (not at Battle of Roanoke Island)
CSS Black Warrior (schooner)

Notes

References
 Porter, David D. The Naval History of the Civil War Castle, Secaucus, NJ, 1984, .

North Carolina in the American Civil War
Dare County, North Carolina
Roanoke Island
Roanoke Island